Christine Lynette Lambkin is an entomologist and scientific illustrator, and Curator of Entomology at the Queensland Museum.

Career 
Lambkin began her career as a science teacher in Sydney and Brisbane after graduating from the University of Queensland with a Bachelor of Science and Diploma of Education in 1976. She then became a Scientific Illustrator at the Queensland Museum in 1986, then with the CSIRO Division of Entomology, Long Pocket, Queensland in 1993. In 1994 Lambkin completed a Certificate of Visual Art and Design at the Queensland College of Art. In 1995 she joined The Department of Entomology at the University of Queensland as a Scientific Illustrator and Research Assistant. In 2001 she attained a PhD at the University of Queensland, and became a Post-doctoral Fellow (2001–2005) and Research Scientist (2003-2006) at the CSIRO Division of Entomology, Canberra. In 2004 Lambkin was a visiting Post Doctoral Fellow at North Carolina State University, in their Department of Entomology.

In 2006, Lambkin returned to the Queensland Museum as the Curator of Entomology. She was the President of Entomological Society of Queensland in 2008, and in 2015 was awarded an Honorary Membership.

Awards 
March 1997: Australian Postgraduate Award, PhD, 1997 - 2000, University of Queensland

August 2014: Peter Doherty Awards 2014 - Science Education Partnership Award for the Queensland Museum community engagement program, Backyard Explorer. 

March 2015: Honorary Membership of the Entomological Society of Queensland

References 

Living people
Year of birth missing (living people)
University of Queensland alumni
Queensland College of Art alumni
Australian entomologists
Scientific illustrators